The Other Side of the Mirror is the fourth solo studio album by American singer and songwriter Stevie Nicks. Released on May 11, 1989, through the Modern Records label, the album was recorded in Los Angeles, California, mixed in Buckinghamshire, England, and is loosely based around the theme of Lewis Carroll's novel Alice's Adventures in Wonderland (1865).

The album was a commercial success. It reached No. 10 on the US Billboard 200, propelled by the hit single "Rooms on Fire" (US No. 16), and achieved Platinum status for selling in excess of one million units. The album reached No. 3 in the United Kingdom and was certified Gold there for sales in excess of 100,000 units. The Other Side of the Mirror is Nicks' highest charting album to date in various European countries including Germany, the Netherlands, Sweden, and the United Kingdom.

Background
Following the huge success of Fleetwood Mac's album Tango in the Night (1987) in the United Kingdom, The Other Side of the Mirror became Nicks' highest-charting solo album there, reaching No. 3 and spawning her first UK Top 40 hit with "Rooms on Fire" (reaching No. 16), which Nicks performed on the BBC show Top of the Pops. The album was certified gold in the United Kingdom for sales in excess of 100,000 copies. Her first, and so far only, solo tour of the United Kingdom and Europe (including Sweden, France and the Netherlands), followed the album. There was also a US tour, though Nicks has famously since commented that she has no recollection of the tours due to her increasing dependency on the prescribed tranquilizer Klonopin at that time.

In the United States, "Two Kinds of Love" was released as a single, featuring vocals by Bruce Hornsby and an instrumental interlude by Kenny G, which became Nicks' first single to fail to chart, missing both the Billboard and Cash Box charts. However, "Long Way to Go" gained substantial airplay, making Billboard's Mainstream Rock chart, and it also made the Top 75 on the UK Singles Chart, as did "Whole Lotta Trouble". Promotional music videos were shot for "Rooms on Fire" and "Whole Lotta Trouble". The former was released with two slightly different edits, while the "Whole Lotta Trouble" video was shot during the American leg of Nicks' tour at the Summit Arena in Houston, Texas.

An earlier, instrumental version of the song "Juliet" (titled "Book of Miracles") was released by Fleetwood Mac in 1987 as the B-side to "Seven Wonders", while “Ooh My Love” was demoed for Tango in the Night but was ultimately shelved. The song "Cry Wolf" was originally recorded by American singer Laura Branigan for her fifth studio album Touch (1987).

Modern Records also released a special long-form interview video on the making of the album, titled "Reflections from the Other Side of the Mirror", which contained newly filmed material shot by Herbert Worthington III. However, it was limited to a worldwide release of 10,000 albums and only 500 VHS releases.

Critical reception

Duncan Holland, reviewer of British music newspaper Music Week, praised the album. He wrote: "This is a remarkably strong record from the single, "Rooms on Fire", to the 11 other tracks on show. Some rather overworked "Alice in Woderland" imagery aside, this is excellent stuff, floating, melodic, twisting and turning." Pete Clark of Hi-Fi News & Record Review also found some warm words. He considered that this work is destined "for those evenings when you just have to leave your brain at the door, there are worse things that can ooze into your ears."

Track listing

Personnel 
Musicians
 Stevie Nicks – vocals, percussion (1, 6), tambourine (2, 4, 5, 7, 10)
 Rupert Hine – keyboards, percussion (1, 3, 6), drum programming (3, 9, 11, 12), additional percussion (4), synth bass (9), bass (12)
 Rick Nowels – guitars (1, 2, 4), acoustic guitar (1)
 Jamie West-Oram – guitars (1-4, 6, 8, 9, 11)
 Waddy Wachtel – acoustic guitar (3, 7, 9, 12), guitars (6, 7, 10)
 Mike Campbell – guitars (5, 6, 7), slide acoustic guitar (6, 10)
 Vail Johnson – bass (1, 4, 5, 7, 10)
 Tony Levin – stick bass (2, 6, 11), bass (3, 8, 12)
 Derek Murphy – bass (7)
 Geoff Dugmore – drums (1, 8), keyboards (8)
 Jerry Marotta – drums (2, 4-7, 10)
 Kenny G – soprano saxophone (3), tenor saxophone (9)
 Marc Russo – saxophones (6)
 Larry Williams – saxophones (6)
 Gary Grant – trumpet (6)
 Jerry Hey – trumpet (6)
 The L.A. Horns – additional brass (6)
 Kelly Johnston – tin whistle (12)
 Sharon Celani – backing vocals (1, 2, 3, 5-12)
 Lori Perry-Nicks – backing vocals
 Bruce Hornsby – vocals (3), acoustic piano (10), additional vocals (10), backing vocals (10)

Production
 Rupert Hine – producer, arrangements
 Stephen W. Tayler – recording, mixing
 Tim Leitner – engineer
 Jimmy Hoyson – assistant engineer
 Lance Krive – assistant engineer
 Paul Loeves – assistant engineer
 Derek Murphy – assistant engineer, mix assistant
 Ray Pyle – assistant engineer
 Bob Salcedo – assistant engineer
 Arun Chakraverty – mastering
 Herbert Worthington III – art direction, photography
 DNZ, The Design Group – design, layout

Studios
 Recorded at Farmyard Studios (Buckinghamshire, England); Lion Share Recording Studios and The Castle Studios (Los Angeles, California); Soundcastle and Ground Control Studios (Hollywood, California); Smoketree Ranch (Chatsworth, California); The Hit Factory (New York City, New York).
 Mixed at Farmyard Studios
 Mastered at Master Room (London, UK).

Charts

Weekly charts

Year-end charts

Certifications and sales

Releases and promotions
 The UK 12-inch and CD single releases of "Rooms on Fire" feature an extended version of the song running at 9:00, and also includes a live version of "Has Anyone Ever Written Anything for You?" recorded during the Rock a Little tour as featured in the video/DVD release of the Red Rocks concert in 1986. A limited edition of the UK 12-inch also came with a glossy, full-size, double-sided poster.
 The single release of "Long Way to Go" ("Two Kinds of Love" in the United States) features the non-album track "Real Tears", while the UK 12" and CD single releases feature an extended remix of "Long Way to Go", running at 6:23 (and not 7:37 as stated on the label). The UK 12-inch release of "Long Way to Go" was also available in a limited edition gatefold sleeve.
The UK CD-single release of "Whole Lotta Trouble" features a live version of "Beauty and the Beast", recorded during the Rock a Little tour as featured in the video release of Live at Red Rocks. A limited edition of the UK 12-inch release also came with a glossy, full-size, double-sided poster.
 The Japanese CD release of the album includes the bonus track "Has Anyone Ever Written Anything for You?" recorded live during the Rock a Little tour. 
 As a promotional giveaway in the United Kingdom, the album was released with a limited edition holographic sticker (the size of the sticker was dependent upon the format; vinyl album, cassette, CD). Album buyers were also given the opportunity to purchase a special display stand for the sticker by mail order.

Tour
Setlist:
 "Outside the Rain"
 "Dreams"
 "Rooms on Fire"
 "Gold Dust Woman"
 "Stand Back"
 "Alice"
 "No Spoken Word"
 "How Still My Love"
 "Beauty and the Beast"
 "Juliet" (performed at some shows)
 "Talk to Me" (performed at some shows)
 "Whole Lotta Trouble"
 "Two Kinds of Love"
 "Edge of Seventeen"
 "Has Anyone Ever Written Anything for You?"

References

Stevie Nicks albums
1989 albums
Albums produced by Rupert Hine
Music based on Alice in Wonderland
Atlantic Records albums
EMI Records albums
Modern Records (1980) albums